Cedar Creek is a  long 4th order tributary to Delaware Bay in Sussex and Kent Counties, Delaware.

Variant names
According to the Geographic Names Information System, it has also been known historically as:  
Slaughter Creek

Course
Cedar Creek rises on the Gum Branch divide about 1 mile west of Hudson Pond Acres, Delaware.  Cedar Creek then flows northeast to meet Delaware Bay by Mispillion Light.

Watershed
Cedar Creek drains  of area, receives about 45.5 in/year of precipitation, has a topographic wetness index of 694.36 and is about 9% forested.

References

Rivers of Delaware
Rivers of Sussex County, Delaware
Tributaries of Delaware Bay